Jessica Carola Julin (born 6 December 1978) is a Finnish former footballer who played in either defence or midfield. She spent several seasons in the Swedish Damallsvenskan representing Umeå IK, Kopparbergs/Göteborg FC, AIK and Stattena IF. After making her debut for the Finland women's national football team in 1997, Julin won 118 caps and participated at UEFA Women's Euro 2005 and UEFA Women's Euro 2009.

A Swedish–speaking Finn, Julin was born on Finland's Independence Day. She grew up in Jakobstad. After moving to Sweden and playing for Umeå IK in 1998 and 1999, Julin accepted a scholarship to University of South Carolina and played varsity soccer from 2000 to 2002. She then returned to Umeå but was Cup-tied for the 2003 UEFA Women's Cup Final because she had played for HJK in their 8–0 defeat to Frankfurt in the quarter final. Julin featured in both legs of the following year's final and collected a winners' medal.

In 2005, she moved on to Martin Pringle's Kopparbergs/Göteborg FC to ensure first team football ahead of the 2005 European Championships in England. Finland reached the semi final with Julin starting all four matches. Julin wound down her career in Sweden with spells at AIK and Stattena.

She made her debut for the senior Finland women's national football team in March 1997; against Norway in the Algarve Cup. Julin also played in all four matches Finland hosted at UEFA Women's Euro 2009, including the quarter final defeat by England. She retired from international football after the tournament.

After the 2010 season Julin retired from playing to become the assistant manager of Jitex BK. She took over as manager of IF Böljan for the 2012 season following two years at Jitex.

In 2014 Julin moved to coach Hovås Billdal IF and also made a playing comeback with the Elitettan club. After leading the club to a best ever fifth-place finish in the 2015 season, she resigned her position.

References

External links
Jessica Julin AIK profile 
Jessica Julin  South Carolina profile

1978 births
Living people
Expatriate women's footballers in Sweden
Expatriate women's soccer players in the United States
Finnish women's footballers
Finland women's international footballers
FIFA Century Club
Swedish-speaking Finns
South Carolina Gamecocks women's soccer players
People from Jakobstad
Damallsvenskan players
BK Häcken FF players
FC United (Jakobstad) players
Helsingin Jalkapalloklubi (women) players
Kansallinen Liiga players
AIK Fotboll (women) players
Umeå IK players
Female association football managers
Finnish expatriate footballers
Women's association football defenders
Women's association football midfielders
Finnish football managers
Sportspeople from Ostrobothnia (region)